Aleksandyr Gerow (1919–1997) was a Bulgarian poet and writer.

1919 births
1997 deaths
20th-century Bulgarian poets
Bulgarian male poets
Bulgarian writers
20th-century male writers